Ormond William Pleasents  (10 November 1882 – 30 September 1946) was an Australian rules footballer who played with Collingwood in the Victorian Football League (VFL).

He had a distinguished military career in World War I, and was awarded the Military Cross for "conspicuous gallantry and devotion to duty near Angres, on 5th November 1918".

He died in Margate, Kent in 1946.

Notes

External links 
		
Orm Pleasents's profile at Collingwood Forever

1882 births
Australian rules footballers from Victoria (Australia)
Collingwood Football Club players
Australian military personnel of World War I
Australian recipients of the Military Cross
1946 deaths